Green Township is a township in Sussex County, New Jersey, United States.  As of the 2010 United States Census, the township's population was 3,601, reflecting an increase of 381 (+11.8%) from the 3,220 counted in the 2000 Census, which had in turn increased by 511 (+18.9%) from the 2,709 counted in the 1990 Census.

History 
On November 20, 1824, the southern portion of Sussex County was set off to create Warren County. The northern portions of both Hardwick and Independence Townships, remained in Sussex County and were incorporated as Green Township by an act of the New Jersey Legislature on December 27, 1824.

In 1829, part of Green Township were transferred to Byram Township, and in 1853 Green Township was expanded to include a section of the old Newtown Township. On February 24, 1904, Fredon Township was incorporated from a portion of the township. The township was named after Ephraim Green, who settled near Greendell in 1770. Many sections of Green retain their own unique identity, such as Tranquility, Huntsville, Greendell and Yellow Frame.

Tranquility was originally known as Kennedytown, named for Amos Kennedy who settled here. When the location for the Tranquility Methodist Church was being chosen, a disagreement arose over erecting it in Allamuchy Township or Kennedytown. A compromise was affected, with the church being erected halfway between the two points. To memorialize the agreement, the church was named Tranquility. Later, Kennedytown took the church's name as its own.

In 1911, the Lackawanna Cut-off rail line opened through Green Township, with a stop at Greendell station. The Cut-Off was part of the Delaware, Lackawanna and Western Railroad's mainline from Hoboken to Buffalo.  The line was abandoned in 1980 and the tracks were removed four years later. New Jersey Transit is considering reactivating passenger service on the line extending to Scranton, Pennsylvania, with a proposed maintenance-of-way facility at Greendell that would incorporate the surviving station building.

In August 2006, a documentary titled The History of Green Township was produced by Kelsey Falkowski. The video includes historical landmarks, interviews with lifelong citizens of Green Township, and leads up to the contemporary view of the township. Copies can be obtained through the Green Township Historical Society.

Geography
According to the United States Census Bureau, Green township had a total area of 16.30 square miles (42.21 km2), including 16.03 square miles (41.53 km2) of land and 0.27 square miles (0.69 km2) of water (1.63%).

Unincorporated communities, localities and place names located partially or completely within the township include Brighton Lakes, Buckmire Pond, Greendell, Huntsburg, Huntsville, Lincoln, Tranquility, Whitehall and Yellow Frame.

Green Township borders the municipalities of Andover Borough, Andover Township, Byram Township and Fredon Township in Sussex County; and Allamuchy Township and Frelinghuysen Township in Warren County.

Demographics

Census 2010

The Census Bureau's 2006–2010 American Community Survey showed that (in 2010 inflation-adjusted dollars) median household income was $103,693 (with a margin of error of +/− $15,229) and the median family income was $113,971 (+/− $20,140). Males had a median income of $85,591 (+/− $9,018) versus $50,583 (+/− $7,305) for females. The per capita income for the borough was $37,546 (+/− $3,396). About 1.3% of families and 2.3% of the population were below the poverty line, including 1.8% of those under age 18 and none of those age 65 or over.

Census 2000

As of the 2000 United States Census there were 3,220 people, 1,046 households, and 890 families residing in the township.  The population density was 199.0 people per square mile (76.8/km2).  There were 1,069 housing units at an average density of 66.1 per square mile (25.5/km2).  The racial makeup of the township was 96.49% White, 0.93% African American, 0.03% Native American, 0.96% Asian, 0.28% from other races, and 1.30% from two or more races. Hispanic or Latino of any race were 3.20% of the population.

There were 1,046 households, out of which 45.5% had children under the age of 18 living with them, 78.9% were married couples living together, 3.8% had a female householder with no husband present, and 14.9% were non-families. 11.0% of all households were made up of individuals, and 3.3% had someone living alone who was 65 years of age or older. The average household size was 3.07 and the average family size was 3.34.

In the township the population was spread out, with 30.8% under the age of 18, 5.0% from 18 to 24, 31.7% from 25 to 44, 26.5% from 45 to 64, and 6.0% who were 65 years of age or older. The median age was 36 years. For every 100 females, there were 104.7 males. For every 100 females age 18 and over, there were 97.3 males.

The median income for a household in the township was $84,847, and the median income for a family was $89,788. Males had a median income of $61,576 versus $33,393 for females. The per capita income for the township was $34,127. About 0.9% of families and 1.6% of the population were below the poverty line, including 1.7% of those under age 18 and 4.5% of those age 65 or over.

Government

Local government 
Green Township is governed under the Township form of New Jersey municipal government, one of 141 municipalities (of the 564) statewide that use this form, the second-most commonly used form of government in the state. The Township Committee is comprised of five members, who are elected directly by the voters at-large in partisan elections to serve three-year terms of office on a staggered basis, with either one or two seats coming up for election each year as part of the November general election in a three-year cycle. At an annual reorganization meeting held during the first week of January, the Township Committee selects one of its members to serve as Mayor and another as Deputy Mayor.

, members of the Green Township Committee are Mayor Margaret H. "Peg" Phillips (R, term on committee ends December 31, 2023; term as mayor ends 2022), Deputy Mayor Virginia "Ginny" Raffay (R, term on committee ends 2023; term as deputy mayor ends 2022), James P. Chirip (R, 2022), James DeYoung (R, 2024; appointed to serve an unexpired term) and Bader G. Qarmout (R, 2022).

The Township Committee chose James DeYoung in March 2022 from the list of candidates submitted by the Republican municipal committee to fill the seat expiring in December 2024 that became vacant following the death of Daniel Conkling the previous month.

In March 2016, the Township Committee selected Bader Qarmout from a list of three candidates nominated by the Republican municipal committee to fill the seat expiring in December 2016 that had been held by Jason Joseph Reinbold until his resignation; Qarmout will serve on an interim basis until the November 2016 general election, when voters will select a candidate to serve the balance of the term.

Federal, state, and county representation 
Green Township is located in the 7th Congressional District and is part of New Jersey's 24th state legislative district.

 

Sussex County is governed by a Board of County Commissioners whose five members are elected at-large in partisan elections on a staggered basis, with either one or two seats coming up for election each year. At an annual reorganization meeting held in the beginning of January, the board selects a Commissioner Director and Deputy Director from among its members, with day-to-day supervision of the operation of the county delegated to a County Administrator. , Sussex County's Commissioners are 
Commissioner Director Anthony Fasano (R, Hopatcong, term as commissioner and as commissioner director ends December 31, 2022), 
Deputy Director Chris Carney (R, Frankford Township, term as commissioner ends 2024; term as deputy director ends 2022), 
Dawn Fantasia (R, Franklin, 2024), 
Jill Space (R, Wantage Township, 2022; appointed to serve an unexpired term) and 
Herbert Yardley (R, Stillwater Township, 2023). In May 2022, Jill Space was appointed to fill the seat expiring in December 2022 that had been held by Sylvia Petillo until she resigned from office.

Constitutional officers elected on a countywide basis are 
County Clerk Jeffrey M. Parrott (R, Wantage Township, 2026),
Sheriff Michael F. Strada (R, Hampton Township, 2022) and 
Surrogate Gary R. Chiusano (R, Frankford Township, 2023). The County Administrator is Gregory V. Poff II, whose appointment expires in 2025.

Politics
As of March 23, 2011, there were a total of 2,449 registered voters in Green Township, of which 337 (13.8% vs. 16.5% countywide) were registered as Democrats, 1,015 (41.4% vs. 39.3%) were registered as Republicans and 1,096 (44.8% vs. 44.1%) were registered as Unaffiliated. There was one voter registered to another party. Among the township's 2010 Census population, 68.0% (vs. 65.8% in Sussex County) were registered to vote, including 94.9% of those ages 18 and over (vs. 86.5% countywide).

In the 2012 presidential election, Republican Mitt Romney received 1,206 votes (68.4% vs. 59.4% countywide), ahead of Democrat Barack Obama with 525 votes (29.8% vs. 38.2%) and other candidates with 28 votes (1.6% vs. 2.1%), among the 1,762 ballots cast by the township's 2,507 registered voters, for a turnout of 70.3% (vs. 68.3% in Sussex County). In the 2008 presidential election, Republican John McCain received 1,271 votes (66.0% vs. 59.2% countywide), ahead of Democrat Barack Obama with 629 votes (32.7% vs. 38.7%) and other candidates with 19 votes (1.0% vs. 1.5%), among the 1,925 ballots cast by the township's 2,417 registered voters, for a turnout of 79.6% (vs. 76.9% in Sussex County). In the 2004 presidential election, Republican George W. Bush received 1,270 votes (70.4% vs. 63.9% countywide), ahead of Democrat John Kerry with 515 votes (28.5% vs. 34.4%) and other candidates with 15 votes (0.8% vs. 1.3%), among the 1,805 ballots cast by the township's 2,230 registered voters, for a turnout of 80.9% (vs. 77.7% in the whole county).

In the 2013 gubernatorial election, Republican Chris Christie received 77.9% of the vote (802 cast), ahead of Democrat Barbara Buono with 19.1% (197 votes), and other candidates with 2.9% (30 votes), among the 1,045 ballots cast by the township's 2,576 registered voters (16 ballots were spoiled), for a turnout of 40.6%. In the 2009 gubernatorial election, Republican Chris Christie received 925 votes (70.1% vs. 63.3% countywide), ahead of Democrat Jon Corzine with 257 votes (19.5% vs. 25.7%), Independent Chris Daggett with 116 votes (8.8% vs. 9.1%) and other candidates with 16 votes (1.2% vs. 1.3%), among the 1,320 ballots cast by the township's 2,404 registered voters, yielding a 54.9% turnout (vs. 52.3% in the county).

Education 

Students in public school for kindergarten through eighth grade attend the Green Township School District at Green Hills School. As of the 2020–2021 school year, the district, comprised of one school, had an enrollment of 380 students and 39.9 classroom teachers (on an FTE basis), for a student–teacher ratio of 9.5:1.

Public school students in ninth through twelfth grades attend Newton High School in Newton, together with students from Andover Borough and Andover Township, as part of a sending/receiving relationship with the Newton Public School District. As of the 2020–2021 school year, the high school had an enrollment of 719 students and 61.0 classroom teachers (on an FTE basis), for a student–teacher ratio of 11.8:1.

Transportation

No Interstate, U.S. or state highways directly serve Green Township. The most prominent roadways are county routes, including County Route 517 and County Route 519.

Notable people

People who were born in, residents of, or otherwise closely associated with Green Township include:

 Lucy Page Mercer Rutherfurd (1891–1948), interred in Green Township, she is considered by historians to have been a mistress of United States President Franklin Delano Roosevelt and was with him on the day he died in 1945

References

External links

 Green Township website
 Green Township Public Schools
 
 School Data for the Green Township Public Schools, National Center for Education Statistics
 Newton Public Schools
 Green Township Historical Society – meets on select Monday nights during Autumn and the Spring months

 
1824 establishments in New Jersey
Populated places established in 1824
Township form of New Jersey government
Townships in Sussex County, New Jersey